Uroeuantha is a genus of parasitic flies in the family Tachinidae.

Species
Uroeuantha longipes Townsend, 1927

Distribution
Philippines.

References

Exoristinae
Diptera of Asia
Tachinidae genera
Taxa named by Charles Henry Tyler Townsend